Roger Dale Brown is an American former politician.

Roger Brown was a resident of Big Spring, Texas. A Democrat, he won a special election to the Texas House of Representatives on 26 May 1965 and was sworn into office on 6 July 1965, succeeding Ed J. Carpenter, who had died in office, as legislator from District 78.

References

Living people
Year of birth missing (living people)
People from Big Spring, Texas
Democratic Party members of the Texas House of Representatives
20th-century American politicians